Darlington Mowden Park Sharks Ladies Rugby Football Club (commonly shortened to DMP Sharks, also known briefly as DMP Durham Sharks for partnership purposes) is a women's rugby union club in Darlington, County Durham, England founded in 1996. Their top try scorer (42 tries in 68 appearances) Louisa Ramsey became the first player to score over 10 tries for Scotland. They are the ladies team of Darlington Mowden Park R.F.C. and play in the Allianz Premier 15s. They also play their home games at The Darlington Arena.

History 
Darlington Mowden Park Sharks were founded in 1996 in Ripon. The club later moved to Thirsk, North Yorkshire where it was known as Thirsk RFC. The club then moved to Darlington in 2006 and became affiliated to Darlington Mowden Park and changed its name accordingly. In 2009, Darlington Mowden Park Sharks were promoted from Championship 1 North to the Women's Premiership after finishing top of the table. They then defeated Championship 1 South team, Bath Rugby Ladies in extra time in the playoffs in order to be promoted.

Darlingon Mowden Park Sharks Ladies used to play their home matches at Yiewsley Drive. In 2012, Darlington Mowden Park purchased The Darlington Arena after its previous tenants, association football club Darlington F.C. went out of business and its phoenix club, Darlington 1883 F.C. decided to play its home games outside Darlington. Darlington Mowden Park Sharks Ladies play their home games at The Darlington Arena alongside Darlington Mowden Park's men's team as well as their mini and junior teams. They started playing at The Darlington Arena in the 2013-14 season. In 2020, as part of the league re-tender process and formal agreements were confirmed, they changed their name to Darlington Mowden Park Durham Sharks to reflect their enhanced partnership with Durham University.

Notable players 
  internationals

  international 
 Sophie Spence

 international
 Lisa Martin
 Caity Mattinson
 Louisa Ramsey
 Lisa Cockburn
 Lisa Thomson
 Sarah Law
 Lana Skeldon
 Liz Musgrove
 Rachel McLachlan
 Evie Tonkin
 Abi Evans (15s and 7s)

References 

Women's rugby union teams in England
Rugby clubs established in 1996